is a Japanese professional shogi player ranked 8-dan.

Early life
Horiguchi was born in Tokyo Metropolis on February 28, 1975. He learned shogi around the age of ten after seeing a shogi set at his grandparents' house.  Horiguchi entered the Japan Shogi Association's apprentice school as a pupil of shogi professional  at the rank of 6-kyū in 1988. He was promoted to the rank of 1-dan in 1991, and entered the 3-dan League in 1993.

Horiguchi came close to obtaining full professional status and the rank of 4-dan in the 17th 3-dan League (April 1995September 1995), but lost his last round game to future fellow professional Kimura Kazuki to miss out on promotion. The following league season, however, Horiguchi finished with a record of 14 wins and 4 losses in the 18th 3-dan League (October 1995April 1996) to win the league and earn promotion to the rank of 4-dan.

Shogi professional
Horiguchi finished runner up in the 48th NHK Cup TV Shogi Tournament (1998) and the 8th  (2000), losing in the finals both times to Yoshiharu Habu. He also finished runner up in the 30th  (1999), losing to Takeshi Fujii 2 games to none.

Horiguchi's only shogi championship to date came in 2002 when he defeated Masataka Sugimoto 3 games to 1 to win the 20th ; he was, however, unable to defend his championship the following year, losing to Kōichi Fukaura by the same score in the finals of the 21st Asahi Open.

Promotion history
Horiguchi's promotion history is as follows:

 6-kyū: 1989
 1-dan: 1991
 4-dan: April 1, 1996
 5-dan: October 14, 1999
 6-dan: October 1, 2002
 7-dan: April 1, 2004
 8-dan: December 15, 2022

Titles and other championships
Horiguchi has yet to appear in a major title match, but he has won one non-major title championship.

Awards and honors
Horiguchi won the Japan Shogi Association's Annual Shogi Award for "Best New Player" in 1991.

References

External links
ShogiHub: Professional Player Info · Horiguchi, Kazushiza

Japanese shogi players
Living people
Professional shogi players
Professional shogi players from Tokyo Metropolis
1975 births